Neogosseidae is a family of worms belonging to the order Chaetonotida.

Genera:
 Kijanebalola Beauchamp, 1932
 Neogossea Remane, 1927

References

Gastrotricha